Pacifier is the debut album by American alternative metal band Nothingface. It was released by DCide on February 6, 1997, and was reissued on August 11, 1998.

Background 
Many of the tracks on Pacifier were re-recorded from the band's 1995 independent release Nothingface. The tracks "Defaced", "Self Punishment", "Hitch", "Useless", "Perfect Person", and "Communion" were all re-recorded from Nothingface with slight lyrical changes.

To help promote the album, music videos were made for the tracks "Pacifier" and "Defaced". In "Pacifier", singer Matt Holt is seen wearing a bright golden jacket, which he claimed the video shooters forced him to wear, in order to give the video a "happier" feel.

Critical reception 

AllMusic gave the album three stars out of five and said that although "Pacifier has garnered unfair comparisons to Korn", the band "show a bright flair that could very well lead them to stardom." Mark Jenkins from The Washington Post criticized Holt's harsh vocals and a lack of variety on the album, although he acknowledged the technical skill and musicianship of the band.

Musical style and lyrics 
Elements of alternative metal, post-punk, and death metal are incorporated throughout the album. Matt Holt's harsh and growling vocals are different from Nothingface releases that come after Pacifier. The album's songs feature a musical formula that has been described as being similar to the band Korn.

Lyrical themes explored include self-loathing, inner turmoil, self-esteem issues, animosity, and feeling suicidal. The track "Defaced" is about child molestation and abuse.

Track listing

Personnel 
Matt Holt – vocals
Tom Maxwell – guitar
Bill Gaal – bass, keyboards, programming
Chris Houck – drums
James SK Wān – bamboo flute

Singles

References 

1997 albums
Nothingface albums